Zion Golan ( Tzion Golan;  Sahyoun Ghawlan;  Zion Golan; b. 1955), also known as Tzion Golan, is an Israeli singer of Yemenite Jewish origin.

Background
Most of Golan's songs are in Judeo-Yemeni Arabic and in Yemenite Hebrew. Most of his songs were written and composed in Israel by himself, his mother in law, Naomi Amrani and by other Israeli writers. Some of his songs were written by the famous Rabbi Shalom Shabazi.

Golan has recorded over 22 albums. He records mostly from a studio in his own home.

Personal life
Golan was born to Yemeni immigrants in Ashkelon, Israel. A modern Orthodox Yemenite Jew, he currently lives with his wife and three children (two girls, one boy) in the Ahuzat Etrog neighborhood of Merkaz Shapira.

In 1974, Golan joined the Israel Defense Forces as a soloist in the Israel Army Rabbinical choir.

Worldwide reach
Golan's music is popular outside of Israel, particularly in Yemen, where his family originates. Though the Yemeni government prohibits direct contact with Israel, Golan's records have managed to reach the Yemeni public via the underground, selling around 50,000 copies per album release. It has been reported that his songs are known to "blare from cafes and taxis" in Yemen.

According to an interview in Israeli daily Yedioth Ahronoth, at one point in time Golan was set to give a performance in Yemen, and visas were to be issued by the Jordanian embassy in Tel Aviv, but the concert was canceled because of concerns for Golan's family.

Golan's songs are also sung by contemporary Yemeni singers such as Fadel Al Hamami.

Example of Songs written in Israel
The following songs were written and composed by Israelis, as mentioned on his album covers:
Aba Shimon – Lyrics by Naomi Amrani, Melody By Zion Golan
Halaluyoh – Lyrics by Naomi Amrani, Melody By Zion Sharabi
Bint AlYaman – Lyrics by Aharon Amram, Melody by Zion Golan & Aharon Amram
Halani – Lyrics by Rabbi Mordechai Yitzhari, Melody by Zion Golan
Salam Salam – Lyrics by Rabbi Mordechai Yitzhari, Melody by Zion Golan
Ahai Bane Teman – Lyrics by Rabbi Mordechai Yitzhari, Melody by Zion Golan
Yuma Ya Yuma – Lyrics by Naomi Amrani, Melody by Zion Golan
Sali Galbi – Lyrics by Naomi Amrani, Melody by Jacky Tubie
Yom Al Ahad – Lyrics by Naomi Amrani, Melody by Jacky Tubie
Diker Almahiba – Lyrics and Melody by Aharon Amram
Adan Adan – Lyrics and Melody by Naomi Amrani
Shufuni Be'Enak – Lyrics by Naomi Amrani, Melody by Zion Golan
Rais Al-Mal – Lyrics by Leah Zlotnik, Melody by Lior Farhi
Alf Mabruk – Lyrics and Melody by Zion Golan
Yaman Yaman – Lyrics and Melody by Naomi Amrani
Allah Yhibak – Lyrics and Melody by Ahraon Amram

Selected Discography
leAkhai Bani Teman, 1992 (To my Yemeni brothers)
Salam Salam, 1995
Abo Sholem Shabazi, 2000
miTemon liYisroel, 2001 (From Yemen to Israel)
Ashorer Shir, 2001?
Irham ya Rabi, 2004
Mahrozot Niflaot v'Duetim, 2005

References

1955 births
Living people
20th-century Israeli male singers
Israeli Modern Orthodox Jews
Israeli pop singers
People from Ashkelon
Yemenite Orthodox Jews
Israeli people of Yemeni-Jewish descent
21st-century Israeli male singers